Will Beall is an American screenwriter and former Los Angeles Police Department detective. He is best known for writing the scripts for Gangster Squad (2013) and the DC Extended Universe films Aquaman (2018) and Zack Snyder's Justice League (2021), and for developing the police TV series Training Day and Deputy, both of which were canceled after one season.

Career
Beall launched his writing career in 2006 with the publication of his acclaimed first novel LA REX, after working for 10 years as a homicide detective and gang investigator with the Los Angeles Police Department. Beall adapted the book for Oscar-winning producer Scott Rudin and the script was featured atop The Black List, Hollywood's annual survey of the industry's favorite screenplays. Between 2009 and 2011, he was a story editor for the ABC TV show Castle, writing several episodes exploring the show's overarching plotline of the hunt for Beckett's mother's killer. Beall wrote the feature film Gangster Squad, which was released in 2013 and starred Sean Penn, Ryan Gosling and Josh Brolin. The film was based on former Los Angeles Times writer and editor Paul Lieberman's book, Gangster Squad, a non-fiction account of what he calls "the battle for Los Angeles" that took place between the police and Mickey Cohen's crew in the mid-1940s.

In June 2012, Beall was hired to write the screenplay for an upcoming Justice League film, in which Superman, Batman, and Wonder Woman were to be the main characters. However, his script was later scrapped by Warners, with Beall replaced with Argo and Batman v Superman: Dawn of Justice screenwriter Chris Terrio, instead he received a "story by" credit with Terrio and Zack Snyder for Zack Snyder's Justice League. The studio also hired him to write the script for Aquaman, but he was again replaced. In July 2016, it was revealed that he was brought back on board to handle the 2018 film's screenwriting duties, with a story treatment from James Wan and Geoff Johns.

Beall was also hired by Warner Bros. to write the screenplay for a reboot of the Lethal Weapon franchise. According to IGN, Beall is writing the script to The Legend of Conan, the sequel to Conan the Barbarian. In an April 2022 article by Deadline Hollywood, Beall was announced to have written the screenplay for Beverly Hills Cop: Axel Foley.

Personal life
Beall married Castle producer and writer Elizabeth Davis on June 30, 2012 at Beltane Ranch in Sonoma Valley, California.

Filmography

Film

Television

References

External links
 

Living people
21st-century American male writers
American male screenwriters
American television writers
American male television writers
Year of birth missing (living people)
21st-century American screenwriters